Cleveland Hill High School is a public high school located in Cheektowaga, Erie County, New York, U.S.A., and is the only high school operated by the Cleveland Hill Union Free School District.

Footnotes

Schools in Erie County, New York
Public high schools in New York (state)